Yosef Shapira (26 December 1926 – 28 December 2013) was an Israeli politician and educator who served as Minister without Portfolio between 1984 and 1988, although he was never a member of the Knesset.

Born in Jerusalem during the Mandate era, Shapira was amongst the leadership of Bnei Akiva and the National Religious Party.

References

External links

1926 births
2013 deaths
People from Jerusalem
Israeli educators
Government ministers of Israel
National Religious Party politicians
Burials at Segula Cemetery